Glipostenoda matsumurai is a species of beetle in the genus Glipostenoda. It was described in 1932.

References

matsumurai
Beetles described in 1932